Pattern Makers League of North America v NLRB, 473 US 95 (1985) is a US labor law case, concerning the right to organize.

Facts
The Pattern Makers League’s constitution said resignations from the union were not permitted during a strike. It fined 10 members for resigning during a strike. The employer claimed to the National Labor Relations Board that the fine was an unfair labor practice under the National Labor Relations Act of 1935 §158(b)(1)(A).

The NLRB held it was an unfair labor practice. The Court of Appeals upheld the NLRB.

Judgment
The Supreme Court, Powell J giving a 5 to 4 opinion, held that fines cannot be enforced against non-union members. The proviso in §158(b)(1)(A) allowing unions to have rules for ‘retention of membership’ does not allow rules restricting resignations from union membership during a strike.

Blackmun, Brennan, Marshall, Stevens J dissented.

See also

US labor law

Notes

References

United States labor case law